20 Ceti is a single star located around 590 light years away in the equatorial constellation of Cetus. It is faintly visible to the naked eye with apparent magnitude is 4.76. The Bright Star Catalogue has this star classified as M0III, matching an aging red giant star that has consumed the hydrogen at its core and expanded. Houk and Swift (1999) listed an earlier class of K5 III. It has around 60 times the Sun's radius and is radiating about 800 times the Sun's luminosity from its enlarged photosphere at an effective temperature of 3,700 K.

References

M-type giants
Cetus (constellation)
Durchmusterung objects
Ceti, 20
005112
004147
0248